Nikolay Semyonovich Shustov (29 December 1834, Saint Petersburg — 5 December 1868, Saint Petersburg) was a Russian painter and member of the Imperial Academy of Arts.

Biography 
His father was a merchant. He received his initial training at the Imperial Academy of Arts. In 1856, he was awarded a silver medal for "painting from nature" and the following year was awarded another for "sketching from life". This was followed by a gold medal in 1858, and another in 1861 for his rather lengthily titled painting "Иоанн III свергает татарское иго, разорвав изображение хана и приказав умертвить послов" (Ivan III overthrowing the Mongol yoke, destroying the Khan's image and killing his ambassadors).

Two years later, he joined the "Revolt of the Fourteen", a group of students who supported the newer Realistic art and were protesting the Academy's insistence on promoting the Classical style. He and the others tendered their resignations and were graduated as "Artists Second-Class". He later joined Ivan Kramskoi and other members of the revolt in a new group called the Artel of Artists.

He died, aged only thirty-three, after suffering from a sudden mental derangement, possibly brought about by excessive drinking.

Selected works

References

Further reading 
 
 A. D. Morozov, "Шустов Н. С." in Русское искусство. Очерки о жизни и творчестве художников второй половины XIX века (Russian art. Essays on the life and work of artists from the second half of the 19th century), general editor, A. I. Leonov. Moscow, Искусство 1962, vol.1, pgs.63-71

External links 

1834 births
1868 deaths
Russian painters
Russian male painters
19th-century painters from the Russian Empire
19th-century male artists from the Russian Empire